Marco Hartmann (born 25 February 1988) is a German professional footballer who most recently played as a defensive midfielder for Dynamo Dresden.

Career
Hartmann came through Hallescher FC's youth system, and was promoted to the first team in 2007. He was a key part of the team that earned promotion to the 3. Liga in 2012 and played in the club's first game at this level, scoring the only goal in a 1–0 win over Kickers Offenbach.

Hartmann signed for Dynamo Dresden at the end of the 2012–13 season. Despite repeatedly struggling with numerous injuries, he quickly rose to become one of the team's leaders and was made team captain in 2016, following the departure of Michael Hefele.

References

External links
 
 

1988 births
Living people
German footballers
People from Leinefelde-Worbis
Footballers from Thuringia
Association football midfielders
Hallescher FC players
Dynamo Dresden players
2. Bundesliga players
3. Liga players